The National Union of Sheet Metal Workers, Coppersmiths, Heating and Domestic Engineers was a trade union in the United Kingdom and Ireland.

History
The union was founded in July 1920 as the National Union of Sheet Metal Workers and Braziers with the merger of a number of unions, including the General Union of Tinplate Workers and the National Amalgamated Association of Tin Plate Workers of Great Britain, and fifteen local unions.  It merged with the competing National Society of Coppersmiths, Braziers and Metal Workers in 1959, renaming itself the National Union of Sheet Metal Workers and Coppersmiths.  Following its 1967 merger with the Heating and Domestic Engineers' Union, it took its final, lengthy name.

The last independent union for sheet metal workers, the Birmingham and Midland Sheet Metal Workers' Society, finally merged into the union in 1973.

The union approved an offer to join the Amalgamated Union of Engineering Workers' Engineering Section in 1979, but this did not go ahead and instead, in 1983, it merged into the Technical, Administrative and Supervisory Section.

Election results
The union sponsored a Labour Party candidate in the 1979 general election:

General Secretaries
1920: Charles Gordon
1922: Charles Hickin
1941: Archibald Kidd
1943: Harry Brotherton
1960: Ted Roberts
1962: Les Buck
1977: George Guy

References

External links
Catalogue of the NUSMWCHDE archives, held at the Modern Records Centre, University of Warwick
Catalogue of the NUSMWCHDE London District archives, held at the Modern Records Centre, University of Warwick
Catalogue of the NUSMWB archives, held at the Modern Records Centre, University of Warwick

Defunct trade unions of the United Kingdom
Sheet metal workers' trade unions
Trade unions established in 1920
Trade unions disestablished in 1983
Defunct trade unions of Ireland
1920 establishments in the United Kingdom
Trade unions based in London